Interplay is a ballet in one act made by Jerome Robbins, subsequently ballet master of New York City Ballet, for Billy Rose's Concert Varieties to Morton Gould's 1945 American Concertette. The premiere took place on Friday, 1 June 1945 at the Ziegfeld Theatre, New York. It was taken into the repertory of the American Ballet Theatre and presented on Wednesday, 17 October that year with costumes by Irene Sharaff. It has been revived for the City Ballet on Tuesday, 23 December 1952 at City Center of Music and Drama.

Original cast
Alicia Alonso
Janet Reed
John Kriza
Harold Lang 
Tommy Rall

References 
  
 Repertory Week, NYCB, Spring season, 2008 repertory, week 5
 Playbill, NYCB, Friday, May 30, 2008

Articles 

Sam Zolotow, "ROSE VAUDEVILLE ARRIVING TONIGHT; 'Concert-Varieties' to Open at the Ziegfeld--Dunham Dancers, Zero Mostel Featured", NY Times, June 1, 1945
"INTERPLAY' TO GET JOFFREY PREMIERE", NY Times, September 26, 1972

Reviews 

Lewis Nichols, "THE PLAY; Vaude., as Art", NY Times, June 2, 1945
John Martin, "NEW ROBBINS WORK AT BALLET THEATRE; Choreographer's 'Interplay' Is Presented for First Time by Troupe at Metropolitan", NY Times, October 18, 1945] 
Time magazine, October 29, 1945
John Martin, "D'AMBOISE DANCES ROLE IN 'INTERPLAY'; Another City Ballet Feature on Week-End Is Jerome Robbins' 1st Appearance of Season", NY Times, May 11, 1953
Clive Barnes, "Ballet: Poisoned Bubbles in the Soda; Acid Comment Lurks in Robbins's 'Interplay'", NY Times, January 22, 1966 
Clive Barnes, "The Ballet: 'Interplay'", NY Times, October 21, 1973
"'INTERPLAY' DANCED BRIGHTLY BY CHRYST", NY Times, March 27, 1976
 Anna Kisselgoff, "CITY BALLET: Peter Martin's 'Rossini Quartets'", NY Times, February 14, 1983
Roslyn Sulcas, "A Feast of Fancies in Three Robbins Works", NY Times, May 29, 2008
Anna Kisselgoff, "CITY BALLET REVIEW; A Delicate Balance in Love and the World", NY Times, June 4, 2004
Alastair Macaulay, "For a Good Cause: Bits and Pieces and Company Depth", NY Times, June 30, 2008

External links 
Internet Broadway Database

video 
 Jacob's Pillow: American Ballet Theatre, July, 1949

Ballets by Jerome Robbins
Ballets by Morton Gould
Ballets designed by Ronald Bates
Ballets designed by Santo Loquasto
1945 ballet premieres
New York City Ballet repertory